Eduardo Ferreira Abdo Pacheco (born 22 March 1987), or simply Eduardo Pacheco, is a Brazilian football striker who last played for Bragantino.

Club career
Born in Ribeirão Preto, São Paulo, Eduardo started playing football with his hometown club Botafogo. In 2004, he joined Atlético Mineiro youth categories. Afterwards, Eduardo was promoted to the first team, and he made his Série A debut in 2007. In August 2008, Eduardo moved to Europe and signed for Turkish Süper Lig club Gaziantepspor. After one season in Turkey, he returned to his homeland, and had a short loan spells with Atlético Paranaense and Sport Recife, both in 2009.

São Caetano
In January 2010, Eduardo signed for São Caetano, and scored 15 goals in 31 matches during the 2010 Série B season. On 2 April 2011, Eduardo scored five goals against São Bernardo in the 2011 Campeonato Paulista, a game which his team won 6–1.

Partizan
After an impressive season with São Caetano, Edu Pacheco garnered interest from the likes of European clubs like Red Star Belgrade and FK Partizan. Finally, on 22 June 2011, Eduardo signed a four-year contract with FK Partizan, however São Caetano remained in possession of 30% of players contract. The transfer was one of the most expensive in Partizan's history as it was worth €1.2 million.

After leaving Partizan Eduardo returned to Brazil where he played with São Caetano in the 2013 Campeonato Paulista and with Joinville in the 2013 Campeonato Brasileiro Série B. He then played with Bragantino in 2014.

Career statistics

Honours
Atlético Mineiro
Campeonato Mineiro: 2007

Partizan
Serbian SuperLiga: 2011–12

Joinville
Copa Santa Catarina: 2013

References

External links
 Eduardo at Guardian Stats Centre
 
 Eduardo at Futpédia
 
 Eduardo Pacheco at Utakmica.rs

1987 births
Living people
People from Ribeirão Preto
Brazilian footballers
Brazilian expatriate footballers
Association football forwards
Clube Atlético Mineiro players
Club Athletico Paranaense players
Sport Club do Recife players
Associação Desportiva São Caetano players
Joinville Esporte Clube players
Clube Atlético Bragantino players
Expatriate footballers in Turkey
Süper Lig players
Gaziantepspor footballers
Expatriate footballers in Serbia
Serbian SuperLiga players
FK Partizan players
Footballers from São Paulo (state)